Anchoradiscus is a genus of monogeneans belonging to the family Ancyrocephalidae.
All members of the genus are parasitic on North American centrachid fish.

Species
A single species is considered valid according to WorRMS: 

 Anchoradiscus triangularis (Summers, 1937) Mizelle, 1941

References

Ancyrocephalidae
Monogenea genera